Yereminskoye is a rural locality (a village) in Verkhovskoye Rural Settlement, Verkhovazhsky District, Vologda Oblast, Russia. The population was 19 as of 2002.

Geography 
Yereminskoye is located 16 km south of Verkhovazhye (the district's administrative centre) by road. Lymzino is the nearest rural locality.

References 

Rural localities in Verkhovazhsky District